Tesfaye Tola (born 19 October 1974) is an Ethiopian long-distance runner, most known for winning a bronze medal in marathon at the 2000 Summer Olympics. The next year he finished fourth at the 2001 World Championships, and fifth in the World Half Marathon Championships.

Achievements

He won the IAAF World Cross Country Championships in 1998

Personal bests
10,000 metres - 28:12.32 (1999)
15 kilometres - 43:13 (2001)
Half marathon - 59:51 (2000)
Marathon - 2:06:57 (1999)

External links

1974 births
Living people
Ethiopian male marathon runners
Ethiopian male long-distance runners
Athletes (track and field) at the 2000 Summer Olympics
Olympic athletes of Ethiopia
Olympic bronze medalists for Ethiopia
World Athletics Championships athletes for Ethiopia
Olympic bronze medalists in athletics (track and field)
Medalists at the 2000 Summer Olympics
20th-century Ethiopian people
21st-century Ethiopian people